Cronberg is a surname. Notable people with the surname include:

 Tarja Cronberg (born 1943), Finnish Green League politician
 Fredrik Magnus Cronberg (1719–1728), Governor of Uppsala 
 Walter von Cronberg (1477 or 1479–1545), Grand Master of the Teutonic Knights

See also
 Kronberg im Taunus, German town